Korotovo is a rural locality (a village) and the administrative center of Korotovskoye Rural Settlement, Cherepovetsky District, Vologda Oblast, Russia. The population was 654 as of 2010. There are 14 streets.

Geography 
Sosnovka is the nearest rural locality.

References 

Rural localities in Cherepovetsky District